The R63 is a tarred provincial route in South Africa that connects Calvinia with Komga via Carnarvon, Victoria West, Graaff-Reinet, Somerset East and King William's Town. It is cosigned with the N10 between Eastpoort and Cookhouse for 24 kilometres.

Route

Northern Cape and Western Cape
The R63 begins 20 kilometres east of Calvinia, Northern Cape at an intersection with the R27 Road. It heads eastwards for 92 kilometres to the town of Williston, where it meets the R353 Road. From Williston, the R63 heads eastwards for 128 kilometres to the town of Carnarvon, where it meets the southern terminus of the R386 Road. At this junction, the R63 turns southwards and heads 63 kilometres to the town of Loxton, where it meets the northern terminus of the R381. At this junction, the R63 turns eastwards and heads 80 kilometres to the city of Victoria West, where it meets the N12 National Route.

From Victoria West, the R63 heads south-east. 48 kilometres from Victoria West, just after crossing into the Western Cape, the R63 meets the N1 National Route. From The N1 junction, the R63 continues south-east to the town of Murraysburg. From Murraysburg, the R63 continues south-east to cross into the Eastern Cape and enter the city of Graaff-Reinet.

Eastern Cape
In Graaff-Reinet Central, the R63 meets the N9 National Route and the R61 Road and all 3 routes share one road southwards before the R63 becomes its own road south-south-east in the southern suburbs of Graaff-Reinet. As the R63 enters Graaff-Reinet, it bypasses the Nqweba Dam and it crosses the Sundays River 3 times (before, during and after sharing a road with the N9/R61). From Graaff-Reinet, the R63 heads southwards for 23 kilometres to meet the northern terminus of the R75 Road. At this junction, the R63 turns eastwards and heads east-south-east for 98 kilometres, through Pearston (where it becomes the Bruintjieshoogte Pass), to the city of Somerset East, where it crosses the Little Fish River twice. The R63 heads eastwards for another 21 kilometres to the town of Cookhouse, where it meets the N10 National Route and crosses the Great Fish River.

The R63 & N10 are one road north-east for 24 kilometres before the R63 becomes its own road eastwards. The R63 heads eastwards for 43 kilometres, through Bedford, to the town of Adelaide, where it crosses the Koonap River and meets the R344 Road. They are one road south-east for almost 4 kilometres before the R344 becomes its own road southwards. From Adelaide, the R63 heads east-south-east for 31 kilometres to enter Fort Beaufort and meet the R67 Road west of the town centre. They are one road for 650 metres up to a t-junction, where the R67 turns north and the R63 turns south to cross the Kat River. Shortly after, the R63 turns eastwards. From Fort Beaufort town centre, the R63 heads eastwards for 22 kilometres to the town of Alice, where it meets the R345 Road in the town centre. They are one road eastwards for almost 5 kilometres before the R345 becomes its own road northwards.

From the R345 split in Alice, the R63 heads eastwards for 54 kilometres, through Dimbaza, to King William's Town in the Buffalo City Metropolitan Municipality, where it meets the N2 National Route. They are one road eastwards as they enter the city centre of King William's Town, crossing the Buffalo River. They become Buffalo Road southwards and at the Grey Street junction, they meet the R346 Road. All 3 routes become Grey Street eastwards up to the Alexandra Road junction, where the R346 becomes Alexandra Road northwards, the N2 becomes Alexandra Road southwards and the R63 remains on the easterly road, which changes its name to Maitland Road and heads north-east for another 3 kilometres to Bhisho, the capital of the Eastern Cape.

The R63 heads north-east for another 25 kilometres to pass the town of Kei Road and meet the N6 National Route. It proceeds eastwards for 44 kilometres, bypassing Komga, to end at another junction with the N2 National Route.

References

External links
 Routes Travel Info

Provincial routes in South Africa
63
63
63